Magutu is a settlement in Kenya's Central Province.

References 

Magutu is also a location in Mathira Division in Nyeri District.

Populated places in Coast Province